Simplice Fotsala (born 9 May 1989) is a Cameroonian professional boxer. As an amateur, he competed in the men's light flyweight event at the 2016 Summer Olympics.

In April 2018, he was one of eight Cameroonian athletes who went missing from their accommodation during the 2018 Commonwealth Games.

Professional boxing record

References

External links
 

1989 births
Living people
Cameroonian male boxers
Olympic boxers of Cameroon
Boxers at the 2016 Summer Olympics
Place of birth missing (living people)
Boxers at the 2018 Commonwealth Games
Commonwealth Games competitors for Cameroon
Light-flyweight boxers
Cameroonian emigrants to Australia
Sportspeople from Yaoundé
Bantamweight boxers
20th-century Cameroonian people
21st-century Cameroonian people